Ylvingen is an island in the municipality of Vega in Nordland county, Norway. The  island lies just off the west coast of Norway, between the island of Vega and the mainland. In 2017, there were 25 residents on the island.

The island is connected by fast ferry to the mainland towns of Brønnøysund and Sandnessjøen, and to the island of Vega and the mainland by car ferry, all operated by Torghatten Trafikkselskap.

The landscape is relatively flat, yet rocky in many places. The island has a relatively large moose population. The residents of the island earn a living by farming and fishing and the island has increasing tourist traffic.

History
During the Second World War, the island was used by the German Armed Forces as an emplacement and had prisoners of war from Russia, Serbia, and Poland doing forced labor. The television series Himmelblå was filmed on the island.

See also
List of islands of Norway

References

Islands of Nordland
Vega, Norway